The 1956–57 NHL season was the 40th season of the National Hockey League. Six teams each played 70 games. The Montreal Canadiens won the Stanley Cup for the second consecutive season, defeating the Boston Bruins four games to one in the best-of-seven final series. The final game was won with a clutch goal from Montreal defenceman Tom Johnson that clinched the Stanley Cup championship for the Canadiens 3-2.

Regular season
On October 1, it was announced that Dick Irvin had resigned as coach of Chicago due to ill health. He was suffering from bone cancer and had been ill for two years and had been hospitalized in Montreal. Irvin had been several days late to training camp. Tommy Ivan took over as coach. Later in the season, it was reported that Irvin had undergone minor surgery for anemia at Ross Memorial Hospital. Irvin died on May 15, 1957.

Ted Lindsay, Detroit's star left wing, became the fourth player to score 300 career goals on November 18, when he picked up two goals in an 8–3 pasting of the Montreal Canadiens. The other players to reach this prestigious mark were Nels Stewart, Maurice Richard and Gordie Howe (who played opposite Lindsay for most of the latter's career).

On January 5, the Rangers and the Black Hawks played an afternoon game at Madison Square Garden where the Rangers beat the Black Hawks 4–1. This game was broadcast on the Columbia Broadcast System network (CBS). Glen Skov spoiled Lorne "Gump" Worsley's would-be shutout with a goal in the third period.

Montreal beat Toronto 2–1 at the Forum in Montreal on January 10 and moved into first place. The game was hard-fought and referee Frank Udvari found it necessary to rule with an iron hand that angered the fans. Fans thought he was calling chippy penalties against the Habs and deliberately failing to call hooking and holding penalties by the Maple Leafs. The blow-off came in the last two minutes of the game. Maurice Richard received a high-sticking penalty. At 18:14, knowing his Maple Leafs were in danger, Toronto coach Howie Meeker pulled goaltender Ed Chadwick for six attackers. Dick Duff scored the tying goal, and Richard went berserk and commenced a heated argument with Udvari, banging his stick on the ice. He might have attacked Udvari if his teammates had not restrained him. Fans threw programmes, paper cups, hats and other debris and the game was held up. When it did resume, Bernie "Boom Boom" Geoffrion set up Don Marshall for the winning goal with a mere six seconds left to play. Although the fans were pleased with the outcome, an angry hum commenced as the players and officials left the ice. Udvari had to be escorted to his dressing room by police and ushers. A large part of the crowd now directed its attention to NHL President Clarence Campbell seated in his box seat and he became the target of jeers and threats. The situation began to show some of the aspects of the Richard Riot of two years previous when Richard had been suspended for an attack on an official. It was at least 30 minutes before Campbell was able to leave under police protection.

Terry Sawchuk had been playing well and was a candidate for the Hart Trophy, when he came down with mononucleosis. He came back too soon and by January 16, he announced his retirement from hockey, a temporary one as he would be back in Detroit next season.

Glenn Hall was not as good as the previous season, but led the Detroit Red Wings to first place. Hall had played only two games prior to 1955–56, but had shown such promise Sawchuk was sent off.

Rule changes
At the start of this season, the NHL changed the way power plays work. Prior to this season, a team could score as many goals as they were able to in a two-minute power play with the penalized player remaining in the penalty box. The NHL changed it so that when a goal is scored on a two-minute power play, the power play finished. The reason for this was because the Montreal Canadiens were so dominant on the power play, the NHL needed a way of ensuring parity. The previous season saw the Canadiens score 26% of all the league's power play goals. Oddly enough, the number of power play goals league-wide actually increased from 251 to 265 after the rule changed. Montreal, though, scored 10 fewer power play goals.

Final standings

Playoffs

Playoff bracket

Semifinals

(1) Detroit Red Wings vs. (3) Boston Bruins

(2) Montreal Canadiens vs. (4) New York Rangers

Stanley Cup Finals

Awards

All-Star teams

Player statistics

Scoring leaders
Note: GP = Games played, G = Goals, A = Assists, Pts = Points, PIM = Penalties in minutes

Leading goaltenders

Note: GP = Games played; Min – Minutes played; GA = Goals against; GAA = Goals against average; W = Wins; L = Losses; T = Ties; SO = Shutouts

Coaches
Boston Bruins: Milt Schmidt
Chicago Black Hawks: Tommy Ivan
Detroit Red Wings: Jimmy Skinner
Montreal Canadiens: Toe Blake
New York Rangers: Phil Watson
Toronto Maple Leafs: Howie Meeker

Debuts
The following is a list of players of note who played their first NHL game in 1956–57 (listed with their first team, asterisk(*) marks debut in playoffs):
Larry Regan, Boston Bruins
Moose Vasko, Chicago Black Hawks
Ralph Backstrom, Montreal Canadiens
Phil Goyette, Montreal Canadiens
Frank Mahovlich, Toronto Maple Leafs
Bob Pulford, Toronto Maple Leafs
Bob Baun, Toronto Maple Leafs

Last games
The following is a list of players of note that played their last game in the NHL in 1956–57 (listed with their last team):
Cal Gardner, Boston Bruins
Harry Watson, Chicago Black Hawks
Marty Pavelich, Detroit Red Wings
Gerry McNeil, Montreal Canadiens
Ted Kennedy, Toronto Maple Leafs

Intraleague draft
The 1956 NHL Intra-League Draft was the first that to occur as part of the league's summer meetings on June 6, 1956.  Two players were chosen for the price of $15,000.

See also
1956-57 NHL transactions
List of Stanley Cup champions
National Hockey League All-Star Game
1956 in sports
1957 in sports

References

 
 
 
 

 

 
Notes

External links
Hockey Database
NHL.com

 
1956–57 in American ice hockey by league
1956–57 in Canadian ice hockey by league